The Freedom Party (Icelandic: Frelsisflokkurinn) is a right-wing populist political party in Iceland. The party was founded in June 2017 and participated in the 2018 city council elections in Reykjavík where it received 147 votes, or about 0.24% of total votes.

References

Right-wing populism in Iceland
Eurosceptic parties in Iceland
Far-right politics in Iceland
Nationalist parties in Iceland